Untold: The Girlfriend Who Didn't Exist is a 2022 American Netflix documentary film directed by Tony Vainuku and Ryan Duffy. The film was released on August 16, 2022.

Summary 
The film is the sixth installment in the nine-part Untold documentary film series. Its story follows the life and career of All-American Notre Dame football player Manti Te'o and explores how a clandestine online relationship threatened both his career and legacy.

See also 
2012 Notre Dame Fighting Irish football team
Deadspin, the sports website that first reported the hoax after receiving an anonymous tip.

References

External links 
 
 
 Official trailer

2022 films
2022 documentary films
American sports documentary films
2020s English-language films
Transgender-related documentary films
2022 LGBT-related films
American LGBT-related films
2020s American films
Netflix original documentary films